Nicolson Calvert may refer to:

 Nicolson Calvert (died 1793) (c1724–1793), MP for Tewkesbury
 Nicolson Calvert (1764–1841), MP for Hertford 1802–26, and for Hertfordshire 1826–34

See also 
 Calvert (surname)